The following is the list of cities in Lithuania that underwent a name change in the past.

Georgenburg → Jurbarkas
Memel → Klaipėda (1923)
Pašešupys → Starapolė (1736) → Marijampolė (1758) → Kapsukas (1956) → Marijampolė (1989)
Šilokarčema → Šilutė (1923)
Vilkmergė → Ukmergė (1920s)
Medininkai → Varniai (16th century)
Sniečkus → Visaginas (1992)
Duoliebaičiai → Władysławów/Vladislavovas (1639) → Naumiestis → Kudirkos Naumiestis (1934)
Zarasai → Novoalexandrovsk (1836) → Ežerėnai (1919) → Zarasai (1929)
Mažeikiai → Muravyov (1899) → Mažeikiai (1918)

See also
List of cities and towns in East Prussia
List of renamed cities in Estonia
List of renamed cities in Latvia

 
Cities, renamed
Lithuania, renamed
Renamed, Lithuania
Lithuania
Names of places in Lithuania